The Rhodes piano (also known as the Fender Rhodes piano) is an electric piano invented by Harold Rhodes, which became popular in the 1970s. Like a conventional piano, the Rhodes generates sound with keys and hammers, but instead of strings, the hammers strike thin metal tines, which vibrate next to an electromagnetic pickup. The signal is then sent through a cable to an external keyboard amplifier and speaker.

The instrument evolved from Rhodes's attempt to manufacture pianos while teaching recovering soldiers during World War II. Development continued after the war and into the following decade. In 1959, Fender began marketing the Piano Bass, a cut-down version; the full-size instrument did not appear until after Fender's sale to CBS in 1965. CBS oversaw mass production of the Rhodes piano in the 1970s, and it was used extensively through the decade, particularly in jazz, pop, and soul music. It was less used in the 1980s because of competition with polyphonic and digital synthesizers such as the Yamaha DX7 and an inconsistent quality control caused by cost-cutting.

In 1987, the company was sold to Roland, which manufactured digital versions of the instrument without authorization from Harold Rhodes. In the 1990s, the instrument experienced a resurgence in popularity, resulting in Rhodes re-obtaining the rights to the piano in 1997. Although Harold Rhodes died in 2000, the Rhodes piano has since been reissued, and his teaching methods are still in use.

Features

The Rhodes piano's keyboard is laid out like a traditional acoustic piano, but some models contain 73 keys instead of 88. The keyboard's touch and action is designed to be like an acoustic piano. Pressing a key results in a hammer striking a thin metal rod called a tine connected to a larger "tone bar". The tone generator assembly acts as a tuning fork as the tone bar reinforces and extends the tine's vibrations. A pickup sits opposite the tine, inducing an electric current from the vibrations like an electric guitar. Simply hitting tines does not need an external power supply, and a Rhodes will make sound even when not plugged into an amplifier, though like an unplugged electric guitar, the volume level and tone will be diminished.

The Suitcase model Rhodes includes a built-in power amplifier and a tremolo feature that bounces the output signal from the piano across two speakers. This feature is inaccurately labeled "vibrato" (which is a variation in pitch) on some models to be consistent with the labelling on Fender amplifiers.

Although the Rhodes functions mechanically like a piano, its sound is very different. Vibrating tines produce a mellower timbre, and the sound changes with the tine's relative position to the pickup. Putting the two close together gives a characteristic "bell" sound. The instrument has been compared with the Wurlitzer electronic piano, which uses a similar technology, but with the hammers striking metal reeds. The Rhodes has a better sustain, while the Wurlitzer produces significant harmonics when the keys are played hard, giving it a "bite". According to Benjamin Love of Retro Rentals, an EQ spectrum analysis of the instrument will have a gap where the frequency of a lead vocal can be. This means the instrument can easily support a voice performance without overpowering it.

History

Early models

Harold Rhodes started teaching piano when he was 19. He dropped out of the University of Southern California in 1929 to support his family through the Great Depression by full-time teaching. He designed a method that combined classical and jazz music, which became popular across the United States, and led to an hour-long nationally syndicated radio show. Rhodes continued to teach piano throughout his lifetime, and his piano method continues to be taught today. He continually refined and updated the design of the instrument up to 1984.

By 1942, Rhodes was in the Army Air Corps, where he created a piano teaching method to provide therapy for soldiers recovering from combat in hospital. From scrapped airplanes, he developed miniature pianos that could be played in bed. Rhodes won a service award for his therapy achievements and put an electric model, the Pre-Piano, into production for home use during the late 1940s.

In 1959, Rhodes entered a joint venture with Leo Fender to manufacture instruments. Fender disliked the higher tones of the Pre-Piano, and decided to manufacture a keyboard bass using the bottom 32 notes (E-B), known as the Piano Bass. The instrument introduced the design that would become common to subsequent Rhodes pianos, with the same tolex body as Fender amplifiers and a fiberglass top. The tops came from a boat manufacturer who supplied whatever color happened to be available; consequently a number of different colored piano basses were produced.

Under CBS

Fender was bought by CBS in 1965. Rhodes stayed with the company, and released the first Fender Rhodes piano, a 73-note model. The instrument comprised parts — the piano, and a separate enclosure underneath containing the power amplifier and loudspeaker. Like the piano bass, it was finished in black tolex, and had a fiberglass top. During the late 1960s, two models of the Fender Rhodes Celeste also became available, which used the top three or four octaves, respectively, of the Fender Rhodes piano. The Celeste did not sell well and is now hard to find. In 1969, the fiberglass lid was replaced with vacuum-molded plastic; the earlier models became known retrospectively as "silvertops".

The Student and Instructor models were introduced in 1965. They were designed to teach the piano in the classroom. By connecting the output of a network of student models, the teacher could listen to each student in isolation on the instructor model, and send an audio backing track to them. This allowed the teacher to monitor individual students' progress. Production of educational models ceased in 1974.

In 1970, the 73-note Stage Piano was introduced as a lighter and more portable alternative to the existing two-piece style, featuring four detachable legs (used in Fender steel pedal guitars), a sustain pedal derived from a Rogers hi-hat stand and a single output jack. Although the Stage could be used with any amplifier, catalogs suggested the use of the Fender Twin Reverb. The older style piano continued to be sold alongside the Stage and was renamed the Suitcase Piano. An 88-note model was introduced in 1971.

The Rhodes became increasingly popular during the 1970s. In 1976, the company posted an advertisement claiming that of the top 100 Billboard albums featuring electric pianos, 82% of them used a Rhodes.

Later models

During the 1970s various changes were made to the Rhodes mechanics. In 1971 the hammer tips were changed to neoprene rubber instead of felt, to avoid the excessive need for regular maintenance, while in 1975 harp supports were changed from wood to aluminum. Although this made production cheaper, it changed the resonance of the instrument slightly. In 1977 the power amplifier design was changed from an 80 to a 100-watt model. The Mk II model was introduced in late 1979, which was simply a set of cosmetic changes over the most recent Mk I models. A 54-note model was added to the range.

The Rhodes Mk III EK-10 was a combination electric piano and synthesizer, introduced in 1980 before CBS bought ARP Instruments in 1981. It used analog oscillators and filters alongside the existing electromechanical elements. The overall effect was that of a Rhodes piano and a synthesizer being played simultaneously. The instrument was unreliable with a problematic production, particularly when a shipment of 150 units to Japan caused interference with local television reception. Compared to the new polyphonic synthesizers being marketed at the same time, it was limited in scope and sound, and very few units were sold.

The final Rhodes produced by the original company was the Mk V in 1984. Among other improvements, it had a lighter plastic body and an improved action that varied the dynamics with each note. The Mark V is the easiest of the original Rhodes pianos for touring musicians to transport. Rhodes pianos produced under the original run had an inconsistent quality as the company wanted to mass-produce the instrument.

During the late 1970s and 1980s, Chuck Monte manufactured an after-market modification to the Rhodes, known as Dyno My Piano. It included a lever that moved the relative position of the tines to the pickups, modifying the sound, and fed the output signal through additional electronics. This sound was emulated by the Yamaha DX7 with a patch known as the DX7 Rhodes that was popular during the 1980s, and caused several players to abandon the Rhodes in favor of the DX7.

After CBS
In 1983, Rhodes was sold to CBS boss William Schultz, who closed the main factory in 1985 and sold the business to the Japanese corporation Roland in 1987. Roland manufactured digital pianos under the Rhodes name, but Harold Rhodes disapproved of the instruments, which were made without his consultation.

Rhodes re-acquired the rights to the Rhodes piano in 1997. By then, he was in ill health and died in December 2000. In 2007, his former business partner Joe Brandstetter acquired the rights to the name and re-formed Rhodes Music Corporation. The company introduced a reproduction of the original electric piano, the Rhodes Mark 7, housed in a molded plastic enclosure. 

In 2021, a new company, Rhodes Music Group Ltd, was formed by the audio company Loopmasters who bought the rights from Brandstetter. They announced a new model, the MK8, in development. The MK8 was made available for pre-order in November with 500 units planned for production in 2022. The MK8's case was designed by Axel Hartmann and its electronics were designed by former Moog Music technician Cyril Lance. At , it is significantly lighter than earlier models.

Notable users

Doors keyboardist Ray Manzarek began using Rhodes instruments when the group formed in 1965. He played basslines on a Piano Bass with his left hand, while playing organ with his right. He also played a full-sized Rhodes in the studio, such as a Mark I Stage 73 on "Riders on the Storm". According to Manzarek, "If Mr. Rhodes hadn't created the keyboard bass, the Doors would never have existed."

The Rhodes piano became a popular instrument in jazz in the late 1960s, particularly for several sidemen who played with Miles Davis. Herbie Hancock first encountered the Rhodes in 1968 while booked for a session with Davis. He immediately became an enthusiast, noting that the amplification made him much more audible in groups when compared to the piano. Hancock continued to experiment with the Rhodes over the following years, including playing it through a wah-wah. Other former Davis sidemen, Chick Corea and Joe Zawinul, started using the Rhodes prominently during the 1970s. Beginning with In a Silent Way (1969), the Rhodes became the most prominent keyboard on Davis's recordings until the mid-1970s. Vince Guaraldi started using a Rhodes in 1968, and toured with both a piano and a Rhodes. He achieved particular prominence with his soundtrack music for A Charlie Brown Christmas and other Peanuts / Charlie Brown films.

Billy Preston was described as the "Ruler of the Rhodes" by Music Radar; he played Rhodes during the Beatles' rooftop concert in 1969, and on the Beatles' hit single "Get Back". Many of Stevie Wonder's recordings from the 1970s, such as "You Are the Sunshine of My Life" feature him playing the Rhodes. He often used one alongside the Hohner Clavinet. Donny Hathaway regularly used the Rhodes; his hit single, "This Christmas", which receives seasonal radio play on African American stations, makes a prominent use of the instrument. Although better known for playing the Wurlitzer, Ray Charles played a Rhodes on his performance of "Shake a Tailfeather" in the film The Blues Brothers.

Donald Fagen of Steely Dan has regularly used the Rhodes. He has also used the Rhodes in all his solo albums and has played it at every one of his touring performances since 1994. The Rhodes features in "Angela", the 1978 instrumental theme from the sitcom Taxi by Bob James. The French band Air make regular use of the Rhodes piano in their recordings. German pianist and composer Nils Frahm uses a Rhodes piano extensively in his studio and live performances.

See also
Dulcitone
Keyboard bass
Vintage Vibe

References 

Bibliography

External links

Rhodes Music Corporation – Company that manufactures the instrument

Electric pianos
Piano manufacturing companies of the United States
Former CBS Corporation subsidiaries